Sikelgaita (also Sichelgaita or Sigelgaita) (1040 – 16 April 1090) was a Lombard princess, the daughter of Prince Guaimar IV of Salerno and second wife of Duke Robert Guiscard of Apulia. She commanded troops in her own right.

Life
She married Robert in 1058, after Robert divorced his first wife Alberada, due to supposed consanguinity. Her sister Gaitelgrima had earlier married Robert's half-brother Drogo. The divorce from Alberada and the marriage to Sikelgaita were probably part of a strategy of alliance with the remaining Lombard princes, of whom Guaimar was chief. Alberada, for her part, appears to have had no qualms about dissolving her marriage.

Sikelgaita tried to mediate between her brother Gisulf II of Salerno and husband when their relations went sour, but her pleas went unheeded and she accepted her brother's lot in the war with Guiscard (1078).

Sikelgaita frequently accompanied Robert on his conquests. She conducted the siege of Trani (1080) while Robert moved against Taranto. Although at first she tried to persuade him not to attack the Byzantine Empire, she nevertheless brought troops and accompanied him on his campaign against them. At the Battle of Dyrrhachium in 1081 she was on the field in full armour, rallying her and Robert's troops when they were initially repulsed by the Byzantine army and were in danger of losing cohesion. According to the Byzantine historian Anna Comnena, she was "like another Pallas, if not a second Athena," and, in the Alexiad, Anna attributes to her a quote from the Iliad. John Julius Norwich wrote:

"in her we come face to face with the closest approximation in history to a Valkyrie. A woman of immense build and herculean physical strength, she hardly ever left her husband's side – least of all in battle, one of her favourite occupations. At such moments, charging magnificently into the fray, her long blond hair streaming out from beneath her helmet, deafening friend and foe alike with huge shouts of encouragement or imprecation, she must have looked – even if she did not altogether sound – worthy to take her place among the daughters of Wotan."

In 1083, Sikelgaita returned to Italy with Robert to defend Pope Gregory VII against the Emperor Henry IV. She accompanied him on a second campaign against the Byzantines, during which Robert died on Kefalonia in 1085 with Sikelgaita at his side. Early in 1086, Sikelgaita was in Salerno making a donation of the town of Cetraro in his honour to Montecassino, which the couple had endowed well throughout their married life.  Sikelgaita donated a large amount of silver for her health while she was ill on another occasion.

Supposedly, she tried to poison Robert's son Bohemond by his first wife, although the two eventually came to an agreement by which her son Roger Borsa was allowed to succeed Robert in the duchy. With her son she put the Jews of Bari under that city's archbishop. In his Historia Ecclesiastica, Orderic Vitalis states that she had studied and had learned about the use of poisons among the doctors of the Schola Medica Salernitana.

On her death, she was, at her own request, buried in Montecassino.

Children
With Robert, Sikelgaita had eight children:
Mafalda (1059/1060 – 1108), married Raymond Berengar II of Barcelona and then Aimeric I, Viscount of Narbonne
Roger Borsa (1060/1061 – 1111)
Guy (d. 1107)
Robert Scalio (d. 1110)
Sibilla (Sybil), married Ebles II, Count of Roucy
Mabillia (Mabel) of Apulia, married William de Grandmesnil
Heria, married Hugh V, Count of Maine
Olympias, betrothed to Konstantios Doukas, son of Michael VII Ducas and Maria Bagrationi, in 1074

Sikelgaita in media
 Sikelgaita is featured as a non-playable character in Age of Empires II: Definitive Edition through the Dawn of the Dukes expansion. She appears in the "Bohemond and the Emperor" scenario as a villain, being Bohemond's wicked stepmother who refuses to help him fight the Normans, with the closing cutscene showing Robert Guiscard's death from illness, with speculation that she poisoned him.

Notes

Sources
Valerie Eads, "Sichelgaita of Salerno: Amazon or Trophy Wife?" Journal of Medieval Military History 3 (2005), pp. 72–87.
Norwich, John Julius. The Normans in the South 1016-1130. Longmans: London, 1967.
Loud, Graham A. The Age of Robert Guiscard: Southern Italy and the Norman Conquest. 2000.
Loud, Graham A. "Coinage, Wealth and Plunder in the Age of Robert Guiscard." The English Historical Review, Vol. 114, No. 458. (Sep., 1999), pp 815–843.
Bloch, Herbert. "Monte Cassino, Byzantium, and the West in the Earlier Middle Ages." Dumbarton Oaks Papers, Vol. 3. (1946), pp 163–224.
Skinner, Patricia. "'Halt! Be Men!': Sikelgaita of Salerno, Gender, and the Norman Conquest of Italy". Gender and History, 12:3 (2000).
Comnena, Anna. The Alexiad. trans. Elizabeth A. Dawes. London, 1928.
Peterson-Gouma, Thalia. Anna Komnene and Her Times. 2000.
Garland, Lynda. Byzantine Empresses. 1999.

1040 births
1090 deaths
11th-century Italian women
People from Salerno
Hauteville family
Lombard princesses
Women in medieval European warfare
Women in 11th-century warfare
11th-century Lombard people
Women in war in Italy
Medieval women scientists
Duchesses of Apulia